Sir Roger Gordon Fry, FRSA, D.Litt, BD (Hons), AKC, PGCE is the President of King's Group of British International Schools now integrated in the Inspired Group. He is Chairman of King’s Group Academies in the UK. He has been a Director of the Independent Schools Council, is a Patron of the Royal Grammar School Worcester, and a Sir Thomas Pope Fellow of Trinity College, Oxford. 

He is a member of the International Educational Advisory Group of the British Council. He was Executive Chairman of the Council of British International Schools (COBIS) from 1996 to 2011. 

He is a Commander of the Order of the British Empire, of the Order of Civil Merit of Spain and of the Order of Alfonso X El Sabio of Spain. He holds an Honorary Doctorate from the University of Portsmouth and was Knighted in 2012.

He is Chairman of the Association of British Schools Overseas (AoBSO) and of the Trustees of the British Hispanic Foundation in Spain and is a Member of the Council of the Imperial Society of Knights Bachelor.

References 

Living people
Educational administrators
Alumni of King's College London
Commanders of the Order of the British Empire
Knights Bachelor
Year of birth missing (living people)